Park Min-woo (Hangul: 박민우, Hanja: 朴珉宇; born February 6, 1993, in Seoul) is a South Korean baseball infielder for the NC Dinos in the Korea Baseball Organization.

Professional career

NC Dinos
In 2014, he batted .298 and scored 87 runs in 118 games, and ranked second in the league with 50 steals. He claimed the KBO League Rookie of the Year Award.

In 2015, he batted .304, 46 steals and scored 111 runs in 141 games.

In 2016, he batted .343, 20 steals and scored 84 runs in 121 games.

On July 16, 2021, Park was suspended the remainder of the season (72 games with 70 games left) after breaking COVID-19 social distancing rules.

International career
He represented South Korea at the 2018 Asian Games.

References

External links 
 Koreabaseball.com profile 
 Min-Woo Park, Baseball-Reference

1993 births
Living people
Baseball players at the 2018 Asian Games
Asian Games gold medalists for South Korea
Medalists at the 2018 Asian Games
Asian Games medalists in baseball
KBO League infielders
KBO League Rookie of the Year Award winners
NC Dinos players
South Korean baseball players
Baseball players from Seoul
South Korean Buddhists